Halibrand is an American maker of racing wheels and quick-change rearend housings.

Halibrand started in Culver City, California in 1946.  Its first product was a magnesium wheel for Indy cars, as a replacement for the wire wheels then commonplace.  The slotted design favored by hot rodders is based on a sprint car design from the 1950s.

Notes

Sources
Shelton, Chris. "Then, Now, and Forever" in Hot Rod, March 2017, pp.16-29.
Taylor, Thom.  "Beauty Beyond the Twilight Zone" in Hot Rod, April 2017, pp.30-43.

Drag racing organizations
1950s cars
1960s cars
Manufacturing companies established in 1946
1946 establishments in the United States